FC Merani Martvili is a Georgian association football club based in Martvili, which currently takes part in Liga 2, the second division of Georgian league system.

Being one of the youngest clubs, Merani have spent five seasons in the top division and once reached the final of David Kipiani Cup.

History
Football clubs from Martvili have previously been called Salkhino Gegechkori (Soviet times), Chkondidi Martvili and Salkhino Martvili.

FC Merani was founded by Georgian ex-minister of communications Pridon Injia in 2006. 

In their first season in Pirveli liga under head coach Malkhaz Zhvania Merani came 3rd and until the promotion to Umaglesi Liga in 2011/12 they stayed among the top five clubs.

In 2010 Merani became a first II league club to play in David Kipiani Cup semifinals where they lost 1-2 on aggregate to WIT Georgia, the Cup winners of the season. The next year Merani successfully completed their season and as a second-placed team gained promotion to the top flight.
 
During the next five seasons in Umaglesi Liga Merani achieved the best result in their first year when they came 5th during the regular season and earned a place in the championship round. In other cases the club was mostly involved in relegation battles.

In 2015/16 Merani were relegated. In the same year they managed to reach the Cup final after having eliminated Dila, Kolkheti-1913 and Chikhura in previous rounds, but in the title-deciding game held in Zestafoni the team was beaten by Torpedo Kutaisi.

Merani came close back to Erovnuli Liga in 2017, although they were unable to beat Kolkheti Poti in promotion play-offs. 
   
At the end of the next season Merani lost the last two league games and surprisingly finished at the bottom of the table, which implied an automatic relegation. After one year spent in Liga 3 though they returned to the second division.

In early 2021 Pridon Injia quit the club and Jesi Surmava, the head of Martvili Football School, took over the management, which resulted in major changes among both staff and squad members. 27 year-old head coach Tsotne Moniava in his first year in charge of a professional club was named the Manager of Round IV (October-December) after guiding Merani to the bronze medals and promotion playoffs. Besides, Merani's two players were included in the symbolic team. Despite a two-goal advantage achieved at home after the first game against Torpedo Kutaisi, the club suffered a heart-breaking extra-time defeat during a dramatic and action-packed return leg.

Seasons
{|class="wikitable"
|-bgcolor="#efefef"
! Season
! Div.
! Pos.
! Pl.
! W
! D
! L
! GF
! GA
! P
!Cup
!Notes
|-
|2007/08
|bgcolor=#ffa07a|2nd
|bgcolor=cc9966 align=right|3 
|align=right|27||align=right|13||align=right|5||align=right|9
|align=right|36||align=right|25||align=right|44
|
|
|-
|2008/09
|bgcolor=#ffa07a|2nd
|bgcolor=cc9966 align=right|3 
|align=right|30||align=right|18||align=right|6||align=right|6
|align=right|45||align=right|24||align=right|60
|Quarter-finals
|
|-
|2009/10
|bgcolor=#ffa07a|2nd
|bgcolor=cc9966 align=right|3 
|align=right|28||align=right|17||align=right|2||align=right|9
|align=right|44||align=right|31||align=right|53
|bgcolor=cc9966|Semi-finals
|
|-
|2010/11
| bgcolor=#ffa07a|2nd
|align=right bgcolor=silver|2 
|align=right|32||align=right|22||align=right|7||align=right|3
|align=right|60||align=right|15||align=right|73
|Round of 16
|Promoted
|-
|2011/12
|1st
|align=right| 8 
|align=right|28 ||align=right|6 ||align=right|3 ||align=right| 19
|align=right|31 ||align=right|55 ||align=right| 21
|Quarter-finals
|
|- 
|2012/13
|1st
|align=right|  8
|align=right|22 ||align=right|7 ||align=right| 2 ||align=right|13 
|align=right|23 ||align=right|36 ||align=right|23 
|Round of 32
|Relegation group
|-
|2013/14
|1st
|align=right|12  
|align=right|22 ||align=right|4 ||align=right|3 ||align=right|15 
|align=right|16 ||align=right|41 ||align=right|15 
|Round of 8
|Relegation group
|-
|2014/15
|1st
|align=right|11  
|align=right|30 ||align=right|9 ||align=right|9 ||align=right|12 
|align=right|29 ||align=right|33 ||align=right|36 
|Round of 16
|
|-
|2015/16
|1st
|align=right|15  
|align=right|30 ||align=right|5 ||align=right|8 ||align=right|17 
|align=right|28 ||align=right|62 ||align=right|23 
|Round of 32 
|Relegated
|-
|2016
|bgcolor=#ffa07a|2nd
|align=right|4  
|align=right|16 ||align=right|9 ||align=right|5 ||align=right|2 
|align=right|31 ||align=right|11 ||align=right|26 
|align=left bgcolor=silver|Runner-up    
|Relegation play-off, won
|-
|2017
|bgcolor=#ffa07a|2nd
|align=right bgcolor=silver|2  
|align=right|36 ||align=right|24 ||align=right|8 ||align=right|4 
|align=right|67 ||align=right|16 ||align=right|80 
|Round of 8  
|Promotion play-off, lost
|-
|2018
|bgcolor=#ffa07a|2nd
|align=right|10  
|align=right|36 ||align=right|8 ||align=right|12 ||align=right|16 
|align=right|36 ||align=right|47||align=right|36 
|Round of 16  
|Relegated
|-
|2019
|bgcolor=cc9966|3rd
|align=right bgcolor=#FFFACD"|1  
|align=right|36 ||align=right|26 ||align=right|4 ||align=right|6 
|align=right|78 ||align=right|24 ||align=right|82 
|Round of 8  
|Promoted
|-
|2020
|bgcolor=#ffa07a|2nd
|align=right|8  
|align=right|18 ||align=right|6 ||align=right|6 ||align=right|6 
|align=right|23 ||align=right|20 ||align=right|30 
|Round of 32  
|Relegation play-off, won
|-
|2021
|bgcolor=#ffa07a|2nd
|align=right bgcolor=cc9966|3  
|align=right|36 ||align=right|19 ||align=right|7 ||align=right|10 
|align=right|65 ||align=right|44 ||align=right|64 
|Round of 16  
|Promotion play-off, lost
|-
|2022
|bgcolor=#ffa07a|2nd
|align=right|4  
|align=right|28 ||align=right|12 ||align=right|6 ||align=right|10
|align=right|55 ||align=right|53 ||align=right|42 
|Round of 16  
|
|}

Current squad
As of 28 February 2023

 (C)

Other teams
Merani also have a reserve team, which as Merani-2 competes in Liga 4.

Stadium
Merani plays home matches at Murtaz Khurtsilava stadium, which has the capacity of 1,850 seats. 

In February 2017 this arena hosted the Georgian Super Cup game.

Honours
Pirveli Liga
 Silver Medal winner: 2010-2011 and 2017
 Bronze Medal winner: 2007-08, 2008-09, 2009-10, 2021

 David Kipiani Cup
 Runners-up 2016

Name
Merani is a Georgian word for pegasus.

External links
Official website

Official Facebook page

Profile on Soccerway

References 

Merani Martvili